Danny aus den Birken (born 15 February 1985) is a German professional ice hockey goaltender. He is currently playing for EHC München in the Deutsche Eishockey Liga (DEL).

Playing career
He previously played with Kölner Haie for parts of five seasons before he joined EHC München as a free agent on 10 April 2015.

Career statistics

International

Awards and honors

References

External links

 

1985 births
Living people
Adler Mannheim players
German ice hockey goaltenders
Iserlohn Roosters players
Kölner Haie players
EHC München players
Sportspeople from Düsseldorf
Ice hockey players at the 2018 Winter Olympics
Medalists at the 2018 Winter Olympics
Olympic ice hockey players of Germany
Olympic medalists in ice hockey
Olympic silver medalists for Germany
Ice hockey players at the 2022 Winter Olympics